The One Patriotic Coalition of Marginalized Nationals (abbreviated as 1-Pacman, and a namesake of Manny Pacquiao) is a political party-list based in the Philippines advocating for the marginalized and displaced sector in the country. In the 2016 national elections, 1-Pacman was one of the contenders in the party-list election. Leading the nominees who vied for a seat were Mikee Romero, who was the team owner of GlobalPort Batang Pier in the Philippine Basketball Association (PBA) and Erick Pineda, who served as Pacquiao's business manager.

Among the main platforms of the party-list were to prioritize sports development, education and job creation.

The party-list group was endorsed by top sports personalities including Pacquiao, Philippine Basketball Association players Jayson Castro, Terrence Romeo, James Yap, LA Tenorio and Marc Pingris, actor John Estrada and volleyball stars Rachel Anne Daquis and Aby Maraño.

Electoral history

Philippine House of Representatives elections, 2019
For the 2019 Philippine House of Representatives elections.:

Mikee Romero, team owner, GlobalPort Batang Pier and CEO of Global900, Inc.
Enrico Pineda, business manager of Manny Pacquiao and team manager of Mahindra Enforcer
Nicolas "Nick" Enciso VIII, former deputy director general of Technical Education and Skills Development Authority (TESDA)
Marvee Espejo, Executive Vice President Z.C. Integrated Port Services Inc.
Edwin Joseph G. Galvez, chairman of the Board GlobalPort 900 Inc.

Electoral results

References

Party-lists represented in the House of Representatives of the Philippines